Steve Colgate (born June 25, 1935) is an American sailor. He competed in the 5.5 Metre event at the 1968 Summer Olympics.

Colgate was president of the International Sailing Schools Association between 1997 and 2003.

References

External links
 

1935 births
Living people
American male sailors (sport)
Olympic sailors of the United States
Sailors at the 1968 Summer Olympics – 5.5 Metre
Sportspeople from New York City